The BBC Advisory Committee on Spoken English aimed to help BBC broadcasters pronounce words—which were often mispronounced—on air. See Received Pronunciation for more.

History 
The committee existed under this name from the years 1926 to 1939. The committee existed under this name from 1926 until 1934, when it was often referenced as both the Full Committee or the Main Committee. It was then abbreviated to the Spoken English Committee. In 1935, sub-committees were installed, including the Sub-Committee on Words and the Specialist Consultants.

The founding of the BBC Advisory Committee on Spoken English was due in large part to John Reith, who was the BBC's first managing editor. Reith wanted to narrow down on-air pronunciations on his network, and in turn created this committee in an effort to set the standard. The committee's first declarations of pronunciation Dos and Don'ts came in the form of a booklet series which was entitled Broadcast English. The series' first installment was entitled "Words of Doubtful Pronunciation." Although the committee existed to enforce specific pronunciations, there is still uncertainty and inconsistency regarding "proper" pronunciations and if there are in fact any within the English language. Eventually the International Phonetic Alphabet was utilized to aid in pronunciations and lessen deliberations.

Today 
Jürg R. Schwyter wrote a book entitled "Dictating to the Mob: The History of the BBC Advisory Committee on Spoken" which was published in 2016. According to the Oxford University Press, Schwyter's work is the first book written on the history of this committee solely. The Oxford BBC Guide to Pronunciation is known as the BBC Advisory Committee on Spoken English's predecessor.

References 

BBC history